In July 2016, the International Union for Conservation of Nature (IUCN) listed 301 near threatened insect species. Of all evaluated insect species, 5.0% are listed as near threatened. 
No subpopulations of insects have been evaluated by the IUCN.

This is a complete list of near threatened insect species and subspecies as evaluated by the IUCN.

Hemiptera

Orthoptera

Hymenoptera

Lepidoptera
Lepidoptera comprises moths and butterflies. There are 62 species in the order Lepidoptera assessed as near threatened.

Swallowtail butterflies

Lycaenids

Nymphalids

Other Lepidoptera species

Beetles
There are 56 beetle species assessed as near threatened.

Geotrupids

Click beetles

Scarabaeids

Other beetle species

Odonata
Odonata includes dragonflies and damselflies. There are 119 species in the order Odonata assessed as near threatened.

Chlorocyphids

Platycnemidids

Gomphids

Cordulegastrids

Corduliids

Calopterygids

Coenagrionids

Aeshnids

Libellulids

Other Odonata species

See also 
 Lists of IUCN Red List near threatened species
 List of least concern insects
 List of vulnerable insects
 List of endangered insects
 List of critically endangered insects
 List of recently extinct insects
 List of data deficient insects

References 

Insects
Near threatened insects
Near threatened insects
Near threatened insects